4,21-Dehydrogeissoschizine is a terpene indole alkaloid.  It is believed to be the precursor leading to the formation of the aspidosperma, corynanthe, and iboga classes of terpene indole alkaloids.

References

Tryptamine alkaloids
Indoloquinolizines